This is a list of events held and scheduled by Bellator MMA (formerly known as "Bellator Fighting Championships"), a mixed martial arts organization based in the United States. The first event, Bellator 1, took place on April 3, 2009.  Upcoming fights are italicized.

Events 

 Bellator 3 and 4 was entirely just one fight card on one night, but were divided in two half-hour episodes that aired on ESPN Deportes via tape delay later. Bellator 3 aired on April 18, 2009, and Bellator 4 aired on April 25, 2009.
 There was no Bellator 8 fight card, instead Bellator ran a "Road to the Championship" episode that was entitled Bellator 8.

Number of events by year

Events locations 

 Total events: 296

These cities have hosted the following numbers of Bellator events as of Bellator 292

 United States (245)

Connecticut (47)
Uncasville, Connecticut – 46
Bridgeport, Connecticut – 1
California (46)
San Jose, California – 13
Temecula, California – 12
Inglewood, California – 7
Fresno, California – 4
Irvine, California – 3
Long Beach, California – 2
Anaheim, California – 1
Lemoore, California – 1
Ontario, California – 1
Visalia, California – 1
San Diego, California – 1
Oklahoma (27)
Thackerville, Oklahoma – 21
Concho, Oklahoma – 2
Newkirk, Oklahoma – 2
Miami, Oklahoma – 1
Norman, Oklahoma – 1
Florida (13)
Hollywood, Florida – 11
Tampa, Florida – 2
New Jersey (11)
Atlantic City, New Jersey – 11
Louisiana (10)
Lake Charles, Louisiana – 4
Monroe, Louisiana – 2
New Orleans, Louisiana – 2
Bossier City, Louisiana – 1
Shreveport, Louisiana – 1
Missouri (9)
Kansas City, Missouri – 4
St. Louis, Missouri – 4
St. Charles, Missouri – 1
Kansas (8)
Mulvane, Kansas – 7
Kansas City, Kansas – 1
Texas (8)
San Antonio, Texas – 2
Cedar Park, Texas – 1
Grand Prairie, Texas – 1
Hidalgo, Texas – 1
Houston, Texas – 1
Laredo, Texas – 1
Robstown, Texas – 1
Illinois (7)
Chicago – 4
Rosemont, Illinois – 3
Arizona (6)
Phoenix, Arizona – 4
Yuma, Arizona – 2
Hawaii (6)
Honolulu, Hawaii – 6
Indiana (4)
Hammond, Indiana – 4
New York (4)
New York City, New York – 2
Uniondale, New York – 1
Verona, New York – 1
Ohio (4)
Dayton, Ohio – 2
Canton, Ohio – 1
Cleveland, Ohio – 1
Pennsylvania (4)
Philadelphia – 1
Reading, Pennsylvania – 1
Bethlehem, Pennsylvania – 1
University Park, Pennsylvania – 1
Iowa (3)
Council Bluffs, Iowa – 2
Cedar Rapids, Iowa – 1
New Mexico (3)
Rio Rancho, New Mexico – 3
Michigan (3)
Mount Pleasant, Michigan – 2
Plymouth Township, Michigan – 1
Mississippi (3)
Tunica, Mississippi – 2
Southaven, Mississippi – 1
South Dakota (3)
Sioux Falls, South Dakota – 3
Idaho (2)
Boise, Idaho – 2
Kentucky (2)
Louisville, Kentucky – 2
Nevada (2)
Reno, Nevada – 1
Whitney, Nevada – 1
Utah (2)
West Valley City, Utah – 2
Georgia (1)
Duluth, Georgia – 1
Maine (1)
Lewiston, Maine – 1
Massachusetts (1)
Boston, Massachusetts – 1
North Carolina (1)
Charlotte, North Carolina – 1
Oregon (1)
Portland, Oregon – 1
Rhode Island (1)
Kingston, Rhode Island – 1
Tennessee (1)
Memphis, Tennessee – 1
Washington (1)
Tacoma, Washington – 1
West Virginia (1)
Chester, West Virginia – 1
Wisconsin (1)
Milwaukee – 1

 Italy (11)
Milan, Italy – 5
Florence, Italy – 2
Torino, Italy – 2
Genoa, Italy – 1
Rome, Italy – 1

 England (10)
London, England – 7
Newcastle, England – 2
Birmingham, England – 1

 Ireland (9)
Dublin, Ireland – 9

 Canada (7)

Ontario (7)
Rama, Ontario – 5
Windsor, Ontario – 2

 Israel (4)
Tel Aviv, Israel – 4

 France (2)
Paris, France – 2

 Hungary (2)
Budapest, Hungary – 2

 Japan (2)
Saitama, Japan – 2

 Northern Ireland (1)
Belfast, United Kingdom – 1

 Russia (1)
Moscow, Russia – 1

See also
List of DREAM events
List of EliteXC events
List of Invicta FC events
List of ONE Championship events
List of Pancrase events
List of Pride FC events
List of PFL/WSOF events
List of Shooto Events
List of UFC events
List of WEC events

References 

Bellator MMA
 
Bellator MMA